A chop bar is a traditional eatery in Ghana mostly located in the country's south. Meals are served in local earthenware bowls and foods are usually eaten at the premises. Most of these bars are stocked with local alcoholic drinks with few foreign drinks available. It is a cultural icon of Ghana, and is a favourite of the locals.

Etymology 
The term 'chop' is derived from 'eat' in Ghanaian pidjin or cut into pieces in a local context. Chop bars mostly sell indigenous Ghanaian foods like fufu, banku, konkonte, and omotuo (rice balls) with different kinds of soup.

See also
 Ghanaian cuisine

References

External links 
 Video:Chop bar in Ghana

Restaurants in Ghana